Waddah al-Yaman, born Abdul Rahman bin Isma’il al-Khawlani (died 708), was an Arab poet.

Biography
Al-Yaman was born in Yemen in the second half of the seventh century. He was famous for his erotic and romantic poems.

He was executed by the Umayyad Caliph Al-Walid I, allegedly due to his over familiarity with his wife. Al-Yaman is now regarded as the national poet of Yemen.

Poetry
Excerpt of one of Al-Yaman's poems:

 She said: "Don’t come to our home, my father is deadly jealous."
 I said: "I’ll pluck you before he knows it, my sword is razor sharp."

 She said: "There’s a whole castle between us."
 I said: "I’ll fly my flag over the castle."

 She said: "There’s a whole sea between us."
 I said: "I’m a strong swimmer."

 She said: "My seven brothers keep an eye on me."
 I said: "I’m a match for them all."

 She said: "Allah is watching us."
 I said: "My lord is Merciful and Forgiving."

 She said: "I have run out of words, so come tonight when everyone’s floating in dreams, and fall on me like dew, undisturbed."

Resources
 Waddah al-Yaman: national poet

See also
List of Arab scientists and scholars

7th-century births
708 deaths
Yemeni poets
Poets from the Umayyad Caliphate
Love in Arabic literature
8th-century Arabs